Miss República Dominicana 2014 was held on August 17, 2014, in Teatro Nacional Eduardo Brito, Santo Domingo, Dominican Republic. Miss Dominican Republic 2013 Yaritza Reyes crowned her successor, Kimberly Castillo, as Miss Dominican Republic 2014 who will represent the Dominican Republic at Miss Universe 2014. The 1st Runner-Up or Miss Hispanoamericana Dominicana is Aletxa Mueses who will represent the country at Reina Hispanoamericana 2014. The 3rd Runner-Up was Maria del Mar López who will compete in Miss Model of the World 2014. The 4th Runner-Up was Analíz de la Cruz who will compete in Miss Globe International 2014. Miss Universe 2013 Gabriela Isler assisted in the crowning of Miss Dominican Republic 2014.

Results 

¤ Won the 15th Semifinalist spot through online voting.

Contestants

References

External links
Official website

Miss Dominican Republic
Dominican Republic